Lina Banzi (2 February 1906 - ?) was an Italian multifaceted athlete and basketball player.

Three-time national champion at individual senior level.

National records
 100 metres: 14.0 ( Busto Arsizio, 11 October 1923) - record holder until 12 October 1924.
 High jump: 1.40 m ( Milan, 17 June 1923) - record holder until 14 September 1924.

National titles
Italian Athletics Championships
High jump: 1923, 1926 (2)
Two-handed discus throw: 1926 (1)

References

External links
 

1906 births
Date of death missing
Place of death missing
Italian female high jumpers
Italian female discus throwers
Italian female sprinters
Italian women's basketball players
Athletes from Milan
20th-century Italian women